Mark Caughey (born 27 August 1960) is a former Northern Ireland international footballer, who played as a striker.

He earned two caps for the Northern Ireland national football team in 1986, and was included in their 1986 FIFA World Cup squad.

During his club career he played for Glentoran, RUC, Linfield, Hibernian, Burnley, Hamilton Academical, Motherwell, Ards, Bangor, Limavady United, and Portstewart.

References

External links
 Northern Ireland Footballing Greats profile
 

1960 births
Living people
Association footballers from Belfast
Association football forwards
Association footballers from Northern Ireland
Northern Ireland international footballers
1986 FIFA World Cup players
Glentoran F.C. players
Linfield F.C. players
Hibernian F.C. players
Burnley F.C. players
Hamilton Academical F.C. players
Motherwell F.C. players
PSNI F.C. players
NIFL Premiership players
Scottish Football League players
English Football League players
Limavady United F.C. players
Ards F.C. players
Bangor F.C. players